The rivière de la Roche Plate (English: flat rock river) is a river in Canada. It is a tributary of the Bras du Nord, flowing in the territory of the municipality of Saint-Raymond, in the MRC Portneuf Regional County Municipality, in the administrative region of Capitale-Nationale, in Quebec. The upper part of this river flows into the western part of the Laurentides Wildlife Reserve.

The lower part of the Roche Plate river valley is mainly served by the rang Saguenay road which first goes up to the north and branches off to the west to serve the north shore of the Bras du Nord including the hamlet Pine Lake. Another secondary forest road goes up this small valley.

Forestry is the main economic activity in this sector; recreotourism activities, second.

The surface of the Roche Plate River (except the rapids) is generally frozen from the beginning of December to the end of March, but the safe circulation on the ice is generally made from the end of December to the beginning of March. The water level of the river varies with the seasons and the precipitation; the spring flood occurs in March or April.

Geography 
The main hydrographic slopes neighboring the Roche Plate river are:
 north side: Neilson River, Couat Lake, Couat Creek, Talayarde River;
 east side: Talayarde river;
 south side: Bras du Nord;
 west side: Bras du Nord, Neilson River.

The Roche Plate river takes its source from a small unidentified forest lake.

This watercourse descends entirely in a small valley in a forest environment according to the following segments:
  to the south, in particular by crossing a small unidentified lake, then crossing on  flat lake, to the outlet (coming from the west) of Lac Bédard and Petit lac Bédard;
  to the south showing a drop of  down the mountain, to a stream (coming from the west);
  south in a small valley, to its mouth.

Toponymy 
The toponym "Rivière de la Roche Plate" was formalized on December 5, 1968, at the Place Names Bank of the Commission de toponymie du Québec.

See also 

 List of rivers of Quebec

References

Bibliography 
 

Rivers of Capitale-Nationale
Laurentides Wildlife Reserve